Forum The Shopping Mall (Chinese: 福临购物中心, Tamil: பாரம் அங்காடி ) is a shopping mall on Singapore's main shopping belt, Orchard Road. It was built on the site of the Singapura Forum Hotel.

Along the upper stretch of Orchard Road and a five-minute walk from Orchard MRT station, the mall is anchored by Toys "R" Us and Julia Gabriel Centre.

See also
 List of shopping malls in Singapore

References

External links
 

Shopping malls in Singapore
Orchard, Singapore
Orchard Road